Lábod is a village in Somogy county, Hungary.

Etymology
Its name derives from the Hungarian word láb which was also the name of the first owner of the village. There is a local joke about it: What flows between your legs? - Brook Rinya. Because the Brook Rinya divides the settlement in two parts: Kis-Lábod and Nagy-Lábod.

History
According to László Szita the settlement was completely Hungarian in the 18th century.

External links 
 Street map (Hungarian)

References 

Populated places in Somogy County